Temperate Australasia is a biogeographic region of the Earth's seas, comprising the temperate and subtropical waters of Australia and New Zealand, including both the Indian Ocean and Pacific coasts of the continent and adjacent islands.

Temperate Australasia is a marine realm, one of the great biogeographic divisions of the world's ocean basins.

Temperate Australasia encompasses the western, southern, and southeastern coasts of Australia, and Tasmania. The tropical waters of northern Australia are part of the Central Indo-Pacific marine realm. Temperate Australasia includes New Zealand's North and South Islands, the Kermadec Islands, Chatham Island, and Snares Island. The rest of New Zealand's subantarctic islands are part of the Southern Ocean realm.

In large parts of the realm along the southern coast of continental Australia, a network of rocky reefs and kelp forests has created a unique biodiversity hotspot known popularly as the Great Southern Reef.

Subdivisions
The Temperate Australasia realm is divided into five marine provinces. The provinces are divided into marine ecoregions.

 Northern New Zealand province
 Kermadec Islands
 Northeastern New Zealand
 Three Kings-North Cape
 Southern New Zealand province
 Chatham Island
 Central New Zealand
 South New Zealand
 Snares Island
 East Central Australian Shelf province
 Tweed-Moreton
 Manning-Hawkesbury
 Southeast Australian Shelf province
 Cape Howe
 Bassian
 Western Bassian
 Southwest Australian Shelf province
 South Australian Gulfs (207)
 Great Australian Bight (208)
 Leeuwin (209)
 Western Central Australian Shelf province
 Shark Bay
 Houtman

References

Marine realms
Indian Ocean
Pacific Ocean